The following is a list of notable deaths in October 2011.

Entries for each day are listed alphabetically by surname. A typical entry lists information in the following sequence:
 Name, age, country of citizenship at birth, subsequent country of citizenship (if applicable), reason for notability, cause of death (if known), and reference.

October 2011

1
Hans Christian Alsvik, 75, Norwegian television presenter.
Butch Ballard, 92, American jazz drummer.
David Bedford, 74, British composer and musician.
Georgina Cookson, 92, British actress.
Philo Dibble, 60, American diplomat.
Robert Finigan, 68, American wine critic.
Ruby Langford Ginibi, 77, Australian author and Aboriginal historian.
J. Willis Hurst, 90, American cardiologist.
José Ángel Ibáñez, 61, Mexican educator and politician, MP (2003–2006).
Paulos Mantovanis, 65, Cypriot Orthodox hierarch, metropolitan bishop of Kyrenia (since 1994).
Sholom Rivkin, 85, American rabbi, last chief rabbi of St. Louis, and of a city in the United States.
Johnny Schmitz, 90, American baseball player (Chicago Cubs, Brooklyn Dodgers).
George E. Smith, 84, American baseball and basketball player.
Sven Tumba, 80, Swedish ice hockey player (world champion 1953, 1957, 1962), footballer and golfer, prostate cancer.

2
Anna Adams, 85, English poet and artist.
Vasily Aleksanyan, 39, Russian lawyer and businessman, Executive Vice President of Yukos, complications from AIDS.
Andrija Fuderer, 80, Croatian-born Belgian chess player.
Taha Muhammad Ali, 80, Palestinian poet.
Peter Przygodda, 69, German film editor, cancer.
Efraín Recinos, 83, Guatemalan architect, muralist and artist, designer of the Centro Cultural Miguel Ángel Asturias.
John Romonosky, 82, American baseball player (St. Louis Cardinals, Washington Senators).
Cindy Shatto, 54, Canadian Olympic diver (1976), lung cancer.
Pavlos Tassios, 69, Greek film director.
Piero Weiss, 83, Italian pianist and author, pneumonia.
Moshe Wertman, 87, Israeli politician.

3
Kay Armen, 95, American Armenian singer.
Anésio Argenton, 80, Brazilian Olympic cyclist.
Aryeh Leib Baron, 99, Canadian rabbi.
Jim Conroy, 73, Canadian football player (Ottawa Rough Riders).
George Harrison, 72, American Olympic gold medal-winning (1960) swimmer, cancer.
Ovidio de Jesús, 78, Puerto Rican Olympic sprinter (1956, 1960).
Héctor Martínez Arteche, 77, Mexican painter.
Aden Meinel, 88, American astronomer and optical scientist.
Jim Neal, 81, American basketball player (Syracuse Nationals, Baltimore Bullets).
Zakaria Zerouali, 33, Moroccan footballer.

4
Bhagwat Jha Azad, Indian politician.
Doris Belack, 85, American actress (Law & Order, One Life to Live, Tootsie), natural causes.
Yelena Chernykh, 32, Russian actress, traffic collision.
Ruth Currier, 85, American dancer, choreographer and dance teacher.
Vittorio Curtoni, 61, Italian science fiction writer and translator.
Kenneth H. Dahlberg, 94, American businessman and World War II fighter ace, natural causes.
Di Gribble, 69, Australian publisher, pancreatic cancer.
Martha Haines, 87, American baseball player (All-American Girls Professional Baseball League).
Ralph Hodgin, 96, American baseball player (Boston Bees, Chicago White Sox).
Hanan Porat, 67, Israeli rabbi, educator and politician, cancer.
Shmuel Shilo, 81, Israeli actor and director, cancer.
Muzaffer Tema, 92, Turkish actor.
Géza Tóth, 79, Hungarian Olympic silver medal-winning (1964) weightlifter.

5
Edward Acquah, 76, Ghanaian Olympic footballer (1964).
Níver Arboleda, 43, Colombian footballer, heart attack.
Derrick Bell, 80, American law professor (Harvard University), originated critical race theory, carcinoid cancer.
Anita Caspary, 95, American Catholic  nun, founder of the Immaculate Heart Community.
Graham Dilley, 52, British cricketer, cancer.
Enver Faja, 77, Albanian architect and diplomat, Ambassador to Poland (1992–1996), after long illness.
Richard Holmlund, 47, Swedish football manager, car accident.
Peter Jaks, 45, Swiss Olympic ice hockey player (1988 Winter Olympics, 1992 Winter Olympics), suicide by standing in front of a train.
Bert Jansch, 67, Scottish folk guitarist, singer and songwriter (Pentangle), cancer.
Steve Jobs, 56, American computer entrepreneur and inventor, co-founder of Apple Inc., pancreatic cancer.
Pietro Lombardi, 89, Italian Olympic gold medal-winning (1948) wrestler.
Charles Napier, 75, American actor (Philadelphia, The Blues Brothers, Austin Powers).
Fred Shuttlesworth, 89, American civil rights leader.
Sarkis Soghanalian, 82, Syrian-born Armenian arms dealer.
Leon Walter Tillage, 74, American writer.

6
Shareef Allman, 47, American employee, suicide by gunshot.
Luis Proto Barbosa, 84, Indian politician.
Zdravko Ceraj, 91, Serbian Olympic athlete.
Diane Cilento, 78, Australian actress (Tom Jones, The Wicker Man, Hombre), cancer.
William S. Dietrich II, 73, American industrialist and philanthropist.
Mathur Krishnamurthy, 82, Indian arts patron.
Daniel Lind Lagerlöf, 42, Swedish director, presumed drowned.
Marilyn Nash, 84, American actress (Monsieur Verdoux, Unknown World).
Birgit Rosengren, 98, Swedish actress.
Igor Shmakov, 26, Russian actor, leukemia.
Neil Street, 80, Australian speedway rider.
Alasdair Turner, 41, British scientist, stomach cancer.
Phil Walker, 67, British newspaper editor.

7
Zaheer Ahmad, 63, Pakistani-born American doctor, brain hemorrhage.
John Alderson, 89, British police officer and media commentator, Chief Constable of Devon and Cornwall Constabulary (1973–1982).
George Alexander, 93, Canadian football player.
Ramiz Alia, 85, Albanian politician, First Secretary of the Party of Labour (1985–1991), President (1991–1992), lung disease.
Julien Bailleul, 23, French footballer.
George Baker, 80, British actor (I, Claudius, The Ruth Rendell Mysteries), pneumonia following a stroke.
Frederick Cardozo, 94, British soldier and SOE veteran.
Fernando Charrier, 80, Italian Roman Catholic prelate, Bishop of Alessandria della Paglia (1989–2007).
*Charles Cuprill Oppenheimer, 95, Puerto Rican major general.
David Hess, 75, American actor (The Last House on the Left), singer and songwriter, heart attack.
Haji Amir Bux Junejo, 95, Pakistani politician.
Paul Kent, 80, American actor (Star Trek II: The Wrath of Khan, A Nightmare on Elm Street 3: Dream Warriors, T. J. Hooker), multiple myeloma.
Fred Kingsbury, 84, American Olympic bronze medal-winning (1948) rower.
Andrew Laszlo, 85, Hungarian-born American cinematographer (First Blood, The Warriors, Newsies).
David Macey, 62, British historian, complications of lung cancer.
Lulama Masikazana, 38, South African cricketer.
Enrique Monsonís, 80, Spanish politician, President of the Generalitat Valenciana (1979–1982).
Gianni Musy, 80, Italian actor and voice actor.
Michel Peissel, 74, French explorer and author, heart attack.
Milan Puskar, 77, American pharmacist, co-founder of Mylan, cancer.
*Julio Mario Santo Domingo, 88, Colombian businessman (SABMiller).
Mildred Savage, 92, American author (Parrish).
Bill Smith, 75, British fell runner and author. (body discovered on this date)
Avner Treinin, 83, Israeli poet and chemist.

8
Dragutin Aleksić, 64, Serbian sculptor.
Terry Cashion, 90, Australian rules football player.
Al Davis, 82, American football coach and team owner (Oakland Raiders), heart failure.
José de las Fuentes Rodríguez, 91, Mexican politician and lawyer, Governor of Coahuila (1981–1987).
Dorothy Heathcote, 85, British drama teacher and academic.
Arthur F. Holmes, 87, American professor of philosophy.
Gregory Possehl, 70, American archaeologist.
Shirley Prestia, 64, American actress (Home Improvement, Dharma & Greg, What Women Want).
Bharatha Lakshman Premachandra, 55, Sri Lankan politician, Member of Parliament (1994–2000), shot.
Harold W. Rood, 89, American political scientist and author.
Nina Sorokina, 69, Russian principal dancer.
Mikey Welsh, 40, American artist and musician (Weezer).
Roger Williams, 87, American pianist (Autumn Leaves), pancreatic cancer.
Ingvar Wixell, 80, Swedish opera singer.

9
Kei Aoyama, 32, Japanese manga artist, suicide by hanging.
Ray Aranha, 72, American actor (Dead Man Walking, Die Hard with a Vengeance, Married People).
Robert Boochever, 94, American federal judge.
Rob Buckman, 63, British-born Canadian oncologist and comedian.
Antonis Christeas, 74, Greek basketball player (AEK Athens) and coach.
Chauncey Hardy, 23, American basketball player, heart attack following beating.
Pavel Karelin, 21, Russian ski jumper, traffic accident.
Mark Kingston, 77, British actor.
Jakkampudi Rammohan Rao, 58, Indian politician, member of the Legislative Assembly of Andhra Pradesh.
Manuel Prado Perez-Rosas, 88, Peruvian Roman Catholic prelate, Archbishop of Trujillo (1976–1999).
James Worrall, 97, Canadian Olympic athlete (1936) and administrator.

10
Ray Aghayan, 83, Iranian-born American costume designer (Funny Lady, Doctor Dolittle).
Milton Castellanos Everardo, 91, Mexican politician, President of Chamber of Deputies (1951), Governor of Baja California (1971–1977).
Alan Fudge, 67, American actor (7th Heaven, Matlock, Hawaii Five-O), lung and liver cancer.
Nakamura Shikan VII, 83, Japanese kabuki performer, Living National Treasure.
Uno Röndahl, 87, Swedish author.
Albert Rosellini, 101, American politician, Governor of Washington (1957–1965), complications from pneumonia.
Jagjit Singh, 70, Indian musician, brain haemorrhage.
Otto Tausig, 89, Austrian writer, director and actor.

11
Amin al-Shami, Yemeni air force colonel, car bomb.
Yerahmiel Assa, 92, Israeli politician.
Kim Brown, 66, British-born Finnish musician, cancer.
George "Mojo" Buford, 81, American blues harmonica player.
Cy Buker, 92, American baseball player (Brooklyn Dodgers).
Justin Canale, 68, American football player.
Adrian Cowell, 77, British documentary film maker.
Ion Diaconescu, 94, Romanian politician, President of Chamber of Deputies (1996–2000), heart failure.
Doctor X, 43, Mexican professional wrestler, shot.
Bob Galvin, 89, American businessman, CEO of Motorola (1959–1986).
Freddie Gruber, 84, American jazz drummer.
Nauman Habib, 32, Pakistani cricketer, murdered.
Henk Hofs, 60, Dutch footballer (Vitesse Arnhem).
Keith Holman, 84, Australian rugby league player and referee.
Dieudonné Kabongo, 61, Congolese-born Belgian comedian, musician and actor (Lumumba).
Frank Kameny, 86, American gay rights activist.
Paul Martin, 79, American baseball player.
Ewald Osers, 94, Czech translator and poet.
František Sokol, 72, Czech Olympic bronze medal-winning (1968) volleyball player.
Derrick Ward, 76, English footballer.
Dino Zucchi, 83, Italian Olympic basketball player.

12
Franz Jozef Van Beeck, 81, Dutch author and Christian theologian.
Heinz Bennent, 90, German actor.
Patricia Breslin, 80, American actress (The People's Choice, Peyton Place, The Twilight Zone), wife of Art Modell, pancreatitis.
Joel DiGregorio, 67, American keyboardist (The Charlie Daniels Band), car crash.
Peter Hammond, 87, British actor and television director.
Lowell H. Harrison, 88, American historian.
János Herskó, 85, Hungarian film director and actor.
Vitali Kuznetsov, 70, Russian Olympic silver medal-winning (1972) judoka.
Paul Leka, 68, American pianist, arranger and songwriter ("Na Na Hey Hey Kiss Him Goodbye", "Green Tambourine").
Lewis Mills, 74, American college basketball coach (University of Richmond) and athletic director.
Dennis Ritchie, 70, American computer scientist, developer of the C programming language and the Unix operating system. (body discovered on this date)
Dick Thornett, 71, Australian triple international sportsman (water polo, rugby union and rugby league), heart disease.
Martin White, 102, Irish hurler.
Winstone Zulu, 47, Zambian AIDS and tuberculosis activist.

13
Sheila Allen, 78, British actress (Bouquet of Barbed Wire, Love Actually, Harry Potter and the Goblet of Fire).
Irén Daruházi-Karcsics, 84, Hungarian Olympic silver (1948, 1952) and bronze (1952) medal-winning gymnast.
Chris Doig, 63, New Zealand opera singer and sports administrator, bowel cancer.
Hasan Güngör, 77, Turkish Olympic gold (1960) and silver (1964) medal-winning weightlifter.
Barbara Kent, 103, Canadian-born American silent film actress.
Tufele Liamatua, 71, American Samoan politician and paramount chief, first elected Lieutenant Governor of American Samoa (1978–1985).
Abdoulaye Seye, 77, Senegalese Olympic bronze medal-winning (1960) athlete.

14
Reg Alcock, 63, Canadian politician, MP for Winnipeg South (1993–2006); President of the Treasury Board (2003–2006), heart attack.
Abdulrahman al-Awlaki, 16, American-Yemeni teenager, drone airstrike.
Margaret Draper, 94, American radio actress and disc jockey, natural causes.
Michael Fitzpatrick, 69, Irish politician, TD for Kildare North (2007–2011), motor neurone disease.
Pierangelo Garegnani, 81, Italian economist and professor.
Ashawna Hailey, 62, American computer scientist.
Adam Hunter, 48, Scottish golfer, leukemia.
Arnaud Jacomet, 64, French historian, Secretary-General of the Western European Union (2009–2011), cancer.
Laura Pollán, 63, Cuban opposition leader, founder of the Ladies in White, cardiorespiratory arrest.
Gunilla von Post, 79, Swedish socialite.
Jaladi Raja Rao, 79, Indian film lyricist and playwright.
Chuck Ruff, 60, American drummer (Edgar Winter, Sammy Hagar), after long illness.

15
Mario Agliati, 89, Swiss-Italian journalist, writer and historian.
Martha Aliaga, 73, Argentine statistics educator.
Ted Bastin, 85, English physicist and mathematician.
David P. Demarest, 79, American academic and writer.
Betty Driver, 91, British singer and actress (Coronation Street), pneumonia.
Sir Donald Dunstan, 88, Australian military officer, Governor of South Australia (1982–1991).
Joan Jaykoski, 78, American AAGPBL baseball player, cancer.
Pierre Mamboundou, 65, Gabonese politician, leader of the Union of the Gabonese People (since 1989), heart attack.
Matthew G. Martínez, 82, American politician, U.S. Representative from California (1982–2001).
Earl McRae, 69, Canadian journalist (Ottawa Sun), apparent heart attack.
Sue Mengers, 79, American talent agent, pneumonia.
Tongai Moyo, 43, Zimbabwean musician, non Hodgkin's lymphoma.
Gerald Shapiro, 61, American fiction writer and academic.
Titus Thotawatte, 82, Sri Lankan director.

16
Hiroshi Arikawa, 70, Japanese voice actor.
Henry Bathurst, 8th Earl Bathurst, 84, British aristocrat and politician.
Eusebio Bertrand, 81, Spanish Olympic sailor.
Ursula Cain, 84, German dancer and dance teacher.
Elouise P. Cobell, 65, American Native rights activist.
Donald Davies, 91, American Episcopal bishop of Dallas and Fort Worth.
Antony Gardner, 84, British politician, MP for Rushcliffe (1966–1970).
*Miguel Ángel Granados Chapa, 70, Mexican journalist.
Charles Hamm, 86, American musicologist.
Rick Huseman, 38, American off-road race truck driver, airplane crash.
Virginia Knauer, 96, American consumer advocate and government official.
Tony Marchington, 55, English biotechnology entrepreneur and preservationist (Flying Scotsman).
Stanley Mitchell, 79, British translator, academic and author.
Caerwyn Roderick, 84, British politician, MP for Brecon & Radnor (1970–1979).
Pete Rugolo, 95, Italian-born American film and television composer (Kiss Me Kate, The Fugitive).
Henning Sjöström, 89, Swedish defense attorney, long illness.
Elisabeth Tankeu, 67, Cameroonian politician, Minister for Planning and Regional Development (1988–1992).
Dan Wheldon, 33, British IndyCar driver, racing accident.
Don Williams, 80, American baseball player (Pittsburgh Pirates, Kansas City Athletics).

17
Hameed Akhtar, 87, Pakistani journalist and writer.
John Morton Blum, 90, American political historian.
Ramaz Chkhikvadze, 83, Georgian-born English stage actor.
Barney Danson, 90, Canadian politician, MP for York North (1968–1979), Minister of National Defence (1976–1979).
Manfred Gerlach, 83, German politician, last Chairman of the State Council of East Germany (1989–1990).
Poul Glargaard, 69, Danish actor.
Osvaldo Guidi, 47, Argentine actor, suicide by hanging.
Carl Lindner Jr., 92, American businessman (United Dairy Farmers, Cincinnati Reds), cardiac arrest.
Elaine Nile, 75, Australian politician, member of the New South Wales Legislative Council (1988–2002), cancer.
Muiris Ó Rócháin, 67, Irish teacher and director of the Willie Clancy Summer School.
Ken Rush, 80, American NASCAR driver.
Piri Thomas, 83, American writer (Down These Mean Streets) and poet, pneumonia.
Edgar Villchur, 94, American inventor of the acoustic suspension loudspeaker.
Xin Huguang, 78, Chinese composer.

18
Uri Amit, 77, Israeli politician.
Bob Brunning, 68, British blues musician (Fleetwood Mac), heart attack.
George Chaloupka, 79, Czech-born Australian historian of indigenous art.
Ruby Cohn, 89, American theater scholar, Parkinson's disease.
Norman Corwin, 101, American radio writer, director and producer.
Paul Everac, 87, Romanian writer, cancer.
Tommy Grant, 76, Canadian football player (Hamilton Tiger-Cats).
Kent Hull, 50, American football player (Buffalo Bills), liver disease.
Jan Marian Kaczmarek, 90, Polish engineer and academic.
Friedrich Kittler, 68, German literary scholar and media theorist.
*Lee Soo-Chul, 45, South Korean football manager, suicide.
Sir Donald McCallum, 89, British engineer and industrialist.
Merritt Ranew, 73, American baseball player (Chicago Cubs)
Anita Sleeman, 80, Canadian composer.
Michael Staikos, 65, Greek-born Austrian Orthodox hierarch, metropolitan bishop of Austria (since 1991).
Jacques Thuillier, 83, French art historian.
Andrea Zanzotto, 90, Italian poet.

19
Munshi Siddique Ahmad, 87, Bangladeshi rice scientist.
Édison Chará, 31, Colombian footballer, shot.
Kakkanadan, 76, Indian Malayalam writer.
Ken Meyerson, 47, American tennis agent.
Bohdan Osadchuk, 91, Ukrainian historian and journalist.
Hollis E. Roberts, 68, American politician, Chief of the Choctaw Nation of Oklahoma (1978–1997), convicted sex offender.
Jeff Rudom, 51, American basketball player and actor.
Tadeusz Sawicz, 97, Polish World War II fighter pilot.
Lars Sjösten, 70, Swedish jazz pianist and composer.
Ronald Smith, 67, British Olympic boxer (1964).
Jon Weaving, 80, Australian operatic tenor, pancreatic cancer.
Keith Williams, 82, Australian tourism entrepreneur (Sea World), stroke.
James Yannatos, 82, American composer and conductor.

20
Ronald Amess, 84, Australian Olympic ice hockey player.
Jerzy Bielecki, 90, Polish social worker, survivor of Auschwitz concentration camp, Polish Righteous among the Nations recipient.
*John Bosco Manat Chuabsamai, 75, Thai Roman Catholic prelate, Bishop of Ratchaburi (1985–2003).
Barry Feinstein, 80, American photographer and photojournalist.
Yann Fouéré, 101, French Breton nationalist.
Mutassim Gaddafi, 36, Libyan Army officer, fifth son of Muammar Gaddafi, shooting.
Muammar Gaddafi, 69, Libyan leader (1969–2011), shooting.
Gale Gillingham, 67, American football player (Green Bay Packers).
Abu-Bakr Yunis Jabr, 59, Libyan military officer and politician, Minister of Defence (1970–2011), shooting.
Hunter, 36, Australian rapper, cancer.
Sue Lloyd, 72, British actress (The Ipcress File, Crossroads).
Antoine Pazur, 80, French footballer.
Iztok Puc, 45, Slovenian handball player, only Olympian handball player to represent three countries, lung cancer.
Morris Tabaksblat, 74, Dutch industrialist.
Roger Tallon, 82, French industrial designer.
Peter Taylor, 84/5, British botanist.

21
Maikano Abdoulaye, 79, Cameroonian politician.
Hikmet Bilâ, 57, Turkish journalist and author, lung cancer.
Antonio Cassese, 74, Italian international law expert, Yugoslavian war crimes judge, cancer.
George Daniels, 85, British horologist.
Thomas Dillon, 61, American serial killer.
Chris Dixon, 67–68, Rhodesian Air Force pilot known as "Green Leader".
Bertram Herlong, 77, American bishop of the Episcopal Diocese of Tennessee.
Digby Jacks, 66, British president of the National Union of Students (1971–1973).
Anis Mansour, 86, Egyptian writer and columnist, pneumonia.
Ettore Milano, 86, Italian cyclist.
Tone Pavček, 83, Slovenian author and translator.
Edmundo Ros, 100, Trinidadian-born British bandleader.
Scott White, 41, American politician, member of the Washington House of Representatives (2009–2011) and State Senator (2011), cardiomegaly complications.

22
Jan Boye, 49, Danish politician, complications from brain hemorrhage.
Jean Dubuisson, 97, French architect.
Peter Goldie, 64, British philosopher.
Trevor Gordon, 96, Australian cricketer.
Kutty, 90, Indian political cartoonist.
Roger Moore, 73, American professional poker player.
Mullanezhi, 63, Indian poet and actor, heart attack.
Cathal O'Shannon, 83, Irish journalist and television presenter.
Robert Pierpoint, 86, American broadcast journalist, complications from surgery.
Roy Smalley Jr., 85, American baseball player (Chicago Cubs, Milwaukee Braves, Philadelphia Phillies).
*Sultan, Crown Prince of Saudi Arabia, 83, Saudi royal, Minister of Defense and Aviation (since 1962) and Crown Prince (since 2005).
Ed Thompson, 66, American politician, Mayor of Tomah, Wisconsin (2008–2010), and gubernatorial candidate, pancreatic cancer.

23
Nusrat Bhutto, 82, Iranian-born Pakistani First Lady, widow of Zulfikar Ali Bhutto and mother of Benazir Bhutto.
John Brown, 81, British Anglican bishop, Bishop in Cyprus and the Gulf (1987–1996)
Joseph Dao, 75, Burkinabé-born Malian Roman Catholic prelate, Bishop of Kayes (1978–2011).
Oscar Stanley Dawson, 87, Indian admiral, Chief of the Naval Staff (1982–1984), brain haemorrhage.
Winston Griffiths, 33, Jamaican footballer.
Herbert A. Hauptman, 94, American Nobel Prize-winning chemist (1985).
Florence Parry Heide, 92, American children's author.
Sir Frank Holmes, 87, New Zealand economist and government advisor.
William Franklin Lee III, 82, American music educator, dean of University of Miami School of Music (1964–1982).
Bronislovas Lubys, 73, Lithuanian entrepreneur and politician, Prime Minister of Lithuania (1992–1993), heart attack.
John Makin, 61, British folk and blues singer (Potverdekke! (It's great to be a Belgian)).
Miroslav Proft, 87, Czech Olympic shooter.
Amnon Salomon, 71, Israeli cinematographer, cancer.
Marco Simoncelli, 24, Italian motorcycle racer, race crash.
Tillie Taylor, 88, Canadian judge.
Bogdan Zakrzewski, 95, Polish historian and researcher of Polish literature.

24
Bob Beaumont, 79, American electric automobile manufacturer (Citicar), emphysema.
Margit Brandt, 66, Danish fashion designer, chronic obstructive pulmonary disease.
Robert Bropho, 81, Australian indigenous rights activist and convicted criminal, natural causes.
Liviu Ciulei, 88, Romanian actor, writer and director, after long illness.
Max Gillett, 84, Australian politician, member of the Victorian Legislative Assembly for Geelong West (1958–1964).
Harold Huskilson, 91, Canadian politician, member of the Nova Scotia House of Assembly (1970–1993).
Kjell Johansson, 65, Swedish table tennis player.
Morio Kita, 84, Japanese novelist, essayist and psychiatrist.
Héctor López, 44, Mexican boxer, Olympic silver medal-winner (1984), drug overdose.
John McCarthy, 84, American computer scientist, creator of LISP and the term AI, heart disease.
Pat McNamara, 85, American Olympic speed skater.
Alan Morgan, 71, British Anglican prelate, Bishop of Sherwood (1989–2004).
Crescênzio Rinaldini, 85, Italian-born Brazilian Roman Catholic prelate, Bishop of Araçuaí (1982–2001).
Sir Peter Siddell, 76, New Zealand artist, brain tumour.
Kirtanananda Swami, 74, American excommunicated Hare Krishna leader and convicted felon, kidney failure.
Bruno Weber, 80, Swiss artist and architect.
Ken Yamaguchi, 55, Japanese voice actor, illness.

25
Leonidas Andrianopoulos, 100, Greek footballer (Olympiacos F.C.).
Perkins Bass, 99, American politician, U.S. Representative from New Hampshire (1955–1963).
Shirley Becke, 94, British police officer, first female to reach chief officer rank.
Bert Cueto, 74, Cuban baseball player (Minnesota Twins).
Arved Deringer, 98, German lawyer (Freshfields Bruckhaus Deringer) and politician.
Donald Foley, 47/48, American actor.
Sinikka Keskitalo, 60, Finnish Olympic long-distance runner.
Wyatt Knight, 56, American actor (Porky's), suicide by gunshot.
Manuel López Ochoa, 77, Mexican actor (Chucho el roto).
Tom McNeeley, 74, American boxer, complications from a seizure.
Mohan Raghavan, 47, Indian Malayalam film director.
Fyodor Reut, 64, Soviet and later Russian military officer.
Bernard Verdcourt, 86, British botanist.
Howard Wolpe, 71, American politician, U.S. Representative from Michigan (1979–1993).
Norrie Woodhall, 105, British stage actress.

26
Salvador Bernal, 66, Filipino designer, National Artist of the Philippines.
Daniel Burke, 82, American television executive, President of ABC (1986–1994), complications of diabetes.
Dave Cole, 81, American baseball player (Boston Braves, Milwaukee Braves, Chicago Cubs).
Mickey Kelly, 82, Irish hurler (Kilkenny GAA).
Aristide Laurent, 70, American publisher and LGBT civil rights advocate.
John Morris, 71, South African cricketer.
William A. Niskanen, 78, American economist, member of the Council of Economic Advisors (1981–1985), chairman of the Cato Institute (1985–2008), stroke.
Jona Senilagakali, 81, Fijian physician and diplomat, Prime Minister (2006–2007).
Jorge Soto, 66, Argentine golfer.
Francisco Villar García-Moreno, 63, Spanish politician, President of National Sports Council (1999-2000).

27
Tom Brown, 89, American tennis player.
T. Max Graham, 70, American actor (Article 99, Eraserhead), cancer.
Ronald Greeley, 72, American planetary scientist.
James Hillman, 85, American psychologist, proponent of archetypal psychology.
Ron Holmes, 48, American football player (Tampa Bay Buccaneers, Denver Broncos).
Eduard Kojnok, 78, Slovak Roman Catholic prelate, Bishop of Rožňava (1990–2008).
Allen Mandelbaum, 85, American professor of Italian literature, poet and translator.
Robert Pritzker, 85, American billionaire industrialist, Parkinson's disease.

28
Ricky Adams, 52, American baseball player (California Angels), cancer.
Tom Addington, 92, British soldier.
Campbell Christie, 74, Scottish trade unionist.
Willy De Clercq, 84, Belgian politician.
Beryl Davis, 87, British big band singer and actress.
R. Sheldon Duecker, 85, American prelate, bishop of the United Methodist Church.
Jiří Gruša, 72, Czech dissident, diplomat and writer.
Roger Kerr, 66, New Zealand public policy and business leader, executive director of the New Zealand Business Roundtable, metastatic melanoma.
Alvin Schwartz, 94, American comic book writer (Batman, Green Lantern, Superman), heart-related complications.
Kan Singh Parihar, 98, Indian jurist.
Arnold Ruiner, 74, Austrian Olympic cyclist.
Sri Lal Sukla, 85, Indian writer, long illness.
Wilmer W. Tanner, 101, American zoologist.
Ed Walker, 94, American World War II veteran and writer, last surviving member of Castner's Cutthroats.

29
Christine Atallah, 45, Canadian singer-songwriter and writer, complications from a fall.
Axel Axgil, 96, Danish gay rights activist.
Dolores Dwyer, 76, American Olympic athlete and actress.
Lloyd G. Jackson, 93, American politician, President of West Virginia Senate (1969–1971).
Robert Lamoureux, 91, French comedian and film director.
Yoland Levèque, 74, French Olympic boxer.
Elfriede von Nitzsch, 91, German Olympic athlete.
Walter Norris, 79, American jazz pianist.
R. C. Pitts, 92, American Olympic gold medal-winning (1948) basketball player.
Ram Revilla, 22, Filipino actor, shot and stabbed.
Jimmy Savile, 84, British disc jockey and television presenter (Top of the Pops, Jim'll Fix It). Hundreds accused him of sexual abuse the year after his death, which resulted in Operation Yewtree.
K. Suppu, 70, Indian politician.
Samdup Taso, 83, Indian hereditary priest.
Walter Vidarte, 80, Uruguayan actor.
Tom Watkins, 74, American football player (Cleveland Browns, Detroit Lions), after long illness.
Mano Wijeyeratne, 54, Sri Lankan politician.

30
John Anderson, 93, British pathologist.
Serge Aubry, 69, Canadian ice hockey player (Quebec Nordiques), diabetes.
Bob Barry, Sr., 80, American sports commentator.
Basile Decortès, 89, French cyclist.
T. M. Jacob, 61, Indian politician, member of the Kerala Legislative Assembly.
Tom Keith, 64, American radio personality (A Prairie Home Companion).
Jonas Kubilius, 90, Lithuanian mathematician.
Phyllis Love, 85, American actress (Friendly Persuasion, The Young Doctors), Alzheimer's disease.
Christopher J. Mega, 80, American politician and judge.
Cyril Parfitt, 97, British artist.
Virgilio Salimbeni, 91, Italian cyclist.
Mickey Scott, 64, German-born American baseball player (Baltimore Orioles, Montreal Expos).
David Utz, 87, American surgeon, removed Ronald Reagan's prostate, heart failure.
Richard Walls, 74, New Zealand politician and businessman, MP for Dunedin North (1975–1978) and Mayor of Dunedin (1989–1995).
Abbas-Ali Amid Zanjani, 74, Iranian cleric and politician, President of Tehran University (2005–2008), heart failure.

31
Flórián Albert, 70, Hungarian footballer, European Footballer of the Year (1967).
Alberto Anchart, 80, Argentine actor (Venga a bailar el rock), cancer.
Liz Anderson, 81, American country music singer-songwriter, complications from heart and lung disease.
Mick Anglo, 95, British comic book writer and artist, creator of Marvelman.
Caridad Asensio, 80, Cuban-American migrant worker advocate, seizure.
Gilbert Cates, 77, American film director and producer (Telecast of the Academy Awards, Oh, God! Book II), founder of Geffen Playhouse.
James Forrester, 74, American physician and politician, North Carolina State Senator (since 1990).
Boris de Greiff, 81, Colombian chess master.
Alfred Hilbe, 83, Liechtensteiner politician, Prime Minister (1970–1974).
Len Killeen, 72, South African rugby league player.
Marios Leousis, 75, Greek magician.
Ali Saibou, 71, Nigerien politician, President (1987–1993).

References

2011-10
 10